Linda Bresonik (born 7 December 1983) is a German retired footballer. She played as a defensive midfielder or wing back. She mostly played for Duisburg, and many times for Germany.

Career

Club

Bresonik began her career at the age of five at TuS 84/10 Essen, before moving to Grün-Weiß Schönebeck in 1995. She joined FCR 2001 Duisburg in 2000 and made her Bundesliga debut for the club. In the 2004–05 season, Duisburg finished runner-up in the league. After a falling out with the club, Bresonik transferred to Bundesliga side SC 07 Bad Neuenahr in 2005, but she only appeared in five matches there. One year later she moved to SG Essen-Schönebeck, where she played for two seasons.

In 2008, Bresonik returned to FCR 2001 Duisburg. During her second stint at the club, she had her biggest success at club level, winning the UEFA Women's Cup in the 2008–09 season. She also won the German Cup twice with Duisburg and finished runner-up in the 2009–10 Bundesliga season.

Bresonik and Duisburg teammate Annike Krahn joined Paris Saint-Germain in July 2012, for a transfer fee described as "rekordverdächtig" (possibly record breaking).

In 2015, she joined MSV Duisburg, before leaving for BV Cloppenburg in 2017.

She announced her retirement on 19 December 2017.

International
Bresonik won the UEFA Women's Under-18 Championship with Germany in 2000. Two years later she came third at the 2002 FIFA U-19 Women's World Championship. Bresonik scored in the penalty shoot-out of the third place play-off. She made her debut for the German senior national team in May 2001 against Italy. Less than two months later, Bresonik won her first major international title at the 2001 European Championship. At the 2003 FIFA Women's World Cup, Bresonik suffered a muscle injury in Germany's second group match. She left the team and returned to Germany, and later only received a third of the pre-arranged winning bonus. Bresonik did not play for the national team for almost four years afterwards.

She eventually returned to the national team at the Four Nations Tournament in January 2007 and was part of Germany's squad that won the 2007 FIFA Women's World Cup. She started in all of the team's six matches. Alongside Kerstin Stegemann, Annike Krahn and Ariane Hingst, Bresonik was part of Germany's defence which did not concede a single goal in the entire tournament. She won the bronze medal at the 2008 Summer Olympics and helped Germany in winning the country's seventh title at the 2009 European Championship. Bresonik was part of Germany's 2011 FIFA Women's World Cup squad.

International goals

Honours

Club
FCR 2001 Duisburg
UEFA Women's Cup: Winner 2008–09
Bundesliga: Runner-up 2004–05, 2009–10
German Cup: Winner 2008–09, 2009–10, Runner-up 2002–03

International
FIFA Women's World Cup: Winner 2003, 2007
UEFA Women's Championship: Winner 2001, 2009
Summer Olympic Games: Bronze medal 2008
FIFA U-20 Women's World Cup: Third-place 2002
UEFA Women's Under-19 Championship: Winner 2000

Individual
Silbernes Lorbeerblatt

References

External links

 

1983 births
Living people
2003 FIFA Women's World Cup players
2007 FIFA Women's World Cup players
2011 FIFA Women's World Cup players
Bisexual sportspeople
Bisexual women
FCR 2001 Duisburg players
Footballers at the 2008 Summer Olympics
Germany women's international footballers
German women's footballers
German expatriate women's footballers
Olympic bronze medalists for Germany
Olympic footballers of Germany
Olympic medalists in football
Medalists at the 2008 Summer Olympics
MSV Duisburg (women) players
Paris Saint-Germain Féminine players
SC 07 Bad Neuenahr players
SGS Essen players
Footballers from Essen
FIFA Women's World Cup-winning players
LGBT association football players
German LGBT sportspeople
Expatriate women's footballers in France
German expatriate sportspeople in France
Women's association football midfielders
Women's association football defenders
Frauen-Bundesliga players
UEFA Women's Championship-winning players
BV Cloppenburg (women) players
Division 1 Féminine players